Paropamisus may refer to:
 Paropamisadae, an old satrapy of the Alexandrian Empire in Afghanistan and Pakistan
 Paropamisus Mountains (or Selseleh-ye Safīd Kūh), a mountain range in northwestern Afghanistan